Mac Scannláin is the name of a family that originated in what is now County Louth in Ireland. Ballymascanlan, near Dundalk, is named after them. The name rarely bears the prefix nowadays, and is usually rendered Scallan, Scanlan or Scanlon.

See also

 Ó Scannláin
 Ó Scannail
 Ó Scealláin

References

 The Surnames of Ireland, Edward MacLysaght, p. 17, Dublin, 1978, .

Surnames of Irish origin
Irish-language masculine surnames